Ashot Movsesovich Satyan (1906–1958) was an Armenian composer and conductor.

From 1948–1952 he was the head of Armenian SSR Composers' Union.  His "Songs of Ararat Valley" were awarded by USSR State Prize in 1952.

Filmography

References

1906 births
1958 deaths
People from Mary, Turkmenistan
Turkmenistan people of Armenian descent
Armenian conductors (music)
Music directors (opera)
20th-century conductors (music)
Soviet classical musicians
Soviet conductors (music)